Nicov is a municipality and village in Prachatice District in the South Bohemian Region of the Czech Republic. It has about 90 inhabitants.

Administrative parts
Villages and hamlets of Popelná, Řetenice and Studenec are administrative parts of Nicov.

References

Villages in Prachatice District
Bohemian Forest